Chotekia is a genus of seed bugs in the tribe Drymini, erected by China in 1935. The genus contains the single species Chotekia typica.

References

External links
 

Drymini